The reticulated giraffe (Giraffa reticulata or Giraffa camelopardalis reticulata), also known as the Somali giraffe, is a species or subspecies of giraffe native to the Horn of Africa. It lives in Somalia, southern Ethiopia, and northern Kenya. There are approximately 8,500 individuals living in the wild. 

Reticulated giraffes can interbreed with other giraffe species in captivity or if they come into contact with populations of other species in the wild.

Together with the Rothschild's giraffe, it is the giraffe most commonly seen in zoos. Its coat consists of large, polygonal, liver-colored spots outlined by a network of bright white lines. The blocks may sometimes appear deep red and may also cover the legs.

Taxonomy
The IUCN currently recognizes only one species of giraffe with nine subspecies, one of which is the reticulated giraffe. All living giraffes were originally classified as one species by Carl Linnaeus in 1758. The subspecies was described and given a binomial name Giraffa reticulata by British zoologist William Edward de Winton in 1899.

Outside of other giraffe (sub)species, the closest living relative to G. reticulata is the Okapi. The common ancestor between these two species emerged at an estimated 11.5 mya. Other close relatives are members of the Cervidae family and Antilocapridae.

Distribution and habitat
Reticulated giraffes historically occurred widely throughout Northeast Africa. Their favored habitats are savannas, woodlands, seasonal floodplains, and rainforests.

Ecology
Reticulated giraffes are diel meaning they are active during the day and the night. They are most active during the early and late parts of the day due to their warmer environment. Their sleep patterns are usually short, consisting of no more than a couple hours at a time typically standing up. The home range of a G. reticulata is nonexclusive and usually overlapping with other individuals or groups. These home ranges include both males and females and vary in size depending on food resources, gender, and water availability. There is no evidence of territorial behavior between G. reticulata.

Diet and foraging habits
The Reticulated giraffe is a herbivore feeding on leaves, shoots, and shrubs. They spend most of their day feeding, roughly 13 hours/day. They are ruminant mammals, also known as hindgut fermentation, which complements their high fiber diet. The only competition for food resources G. reticulata encounters is elephants (Proboscidea).

Social behavior
Reticulated giraffes can typically be seen in groups of 3-9, but there are instances of lone individuals. Kinship between females typically drives a group. Females are known to share protection of other young during predation.

Reproduction
Females display reproductive receptivity by emitting odor from their vaginal area and hindparts. The estrous cycle of a female is about 15 days. A male can enhance this scent by curling it's lip which assists in bringing the odor to the vomeronasal organ of the giraffe. Dominant males will guard estrus females from other competing males. When the male is ready to breed, he notifies the female by tapping the female's hindleg with his foreleg or by resting his head on the females back. Post-reproduction there is no long term bonds between males and females. 
The gestation period of G. reticulata is on average 445-457 days, producing one offspring. The occasion of producing two offspring is rare but documented. The female will give birth standing up, and the offspring will stand up anywhere between 5-20 minutes post-birth. Weaning age of the young varies anywhere between 6-17 months, and independence occurs at 2 years old.

Conservation
To save the remaining 9,000, or so, Reticulated giraffes, several conservation organizations have been formed. One of these organizations is San Diego Zoo Global's "Twiga Walinzi" (meaning Giraffe Guards) initiative. Their work includes hiring and training local Kenyans to monitor 120 trail cameras in Northern Kenya (Loisaba Conservancy and Namunyak Wildlife Conservancy) that capture footage of wild giraffes and other Kenyan wildlife; developing a photo ID database so individual giraffes can be tracked; informing rangers of poaching incidents and removing snares; caring for orphaned giraffes; and educating communities about giraffe conservation.

In captivity 
Along with the Rothschild's giraffe, the reticulated giraffe is the most common giraffe found in zoos. The Cheyenne Mountain Zoo in Colorado Springs, Colorado is said to have the largest reticulated giraffe herd in North America. Reticulated and Rothschild's giraffes have been bred together in the past. This was done because it was thought that the giraffe subspecies interbred in the wild. However, research published in 2016 found that they do not. Nevertheless, some zoos are still interbreeding them.

A few zoos have distinct Rothschild's giraffe or reticulated giraffe herds. The San Diego Zoo Safari Park, Bronx Zoo, and Chester Zoo have solely Rothschild's giraffes. The Cheyenne Mountain Zoo, Busch Gardens Tampa, the Maryland Zoo, Omaha's Henry Doorly Zoo, the Louisville Zoo, and the Binder Park Zoo have solely reticulated giraffes.

References

Bercovitch FB, Berry PSM. 2009. Reproductive life history of Thornicroft's giraffe in Zambia. African Journal of Ecology. 48(2):535-538. http://dx.doi.org/10.1111/j.1365-2028.2009.01145.x

Bercovitch FB, Berry PSM. 2012. Herd composition, kinship and fission-fusion social dynamics among wild giraffe. African Journal of Ecology. 51(2):206-216. http://dx.doi.org/10.1111/aje.12024

Bercovitch FB, Deacon F. 2015. Gazing at a giraffe gyroscope: Where are we going? African Journal of Ecology. 53(2):135-146. http://dx.doi.org/10.1111/aje.12222

Dagg AI. 2014. Giraffe: biology, behaviour and conservation. Cambridge, UK: Cambridge University Press.

Fennessy J. 2009. Home range and seasonal movements of Giraffa camelopardalis angolensis in the northern Namib Desert. African Journal of Ecology. 47(3):318.

Pellew RA (1984b) The feeding ecology of a selective browser, the giraffe (Giraffa camelopardalis tippelskirchi). Journal of Zoology 202: 57– 81.

Langman VA. 1977. Cow-calf relationships in giraffe (Giraffa camelopardalis giraffa). Ethology. 43(3):264-286. http://dx.doi.org/10.1111/j.1439-0310.1977.tb00074.x

Wilson DE, Mittermeier RA, editors. Handbook of the mammals of the world, volume 2. Barcelona (Spain): Lynx Edicions; c2011. Family Giraffidae, Hoofed Mammals; p. 788-802.

External links

 Cheyenne Mountain Zoo Giraffe Cam
 Saint Louis Zoo, Reticulated Giraffe
 The BIG zoo
 Saint Louis Zoo Article

reticulated giraffe
Mammals of Ethiopia
Mammals of Kenya
Mammals of Somalia
Fauna of East Africa
reticulated giraffe
reticulated giraffe
Taxobox binomials not recognized by IUCN